Garry Williams (born 11 March 1953) is a New Zealand former cricketer. He played eight first-class matches for Otago between 1975 and 1978.

See also
 List of Otago representative cricketers

References

External links
 

1953 births
Living people
New Zealand cricketers
Otago cricketers
Cricketers from Dunedin